Terror was an open sailing boat built around 1890 and used for conveying oysters around Chichester Harbour. It is believed to have been one of a number built by Foster's in Emsworth c. 1890.

History
At around 29 ft (8.83 m) long, 9 ft 6 in (2.90 m) in beam and 2 ft 6 in (76.2 cm) deep, Terror was used in the oyster fishery of Chichester Harbour as a lighter to transport oysters from larger vessels to the shore until the fisheries rapid decline after 1902.

She had a number of private owners throughout the 20th century until purchased in 2004 by Chichester Harbour Conservancy and restored at Dolphin quay Boat Yard, Emsworth, with the help of a lottery grant. The restoration was completed and the boat was re-launched in September 2006. From May 2007, Terror will be sailing once again from Emsworth and will give public trips to experience life as an oyster fisherman first-hand.

The boat is now managed by the Friends of Chichester Harbour and run by a volunteer committee.

References

External links
Chichester Harbour Conservancy
The Emsworth Heritage Project
 Oyster boat Terror website

Fishing vessels of the United Kingdom